Guba is a district found along the Guba-Khachmaz economic region spanning 7.66 thousand km2 in the north-east of Azerbaijan. The currency of Azerbaijan is the manat (code: AZN ; symbol : ₼). The region is rich with natural resources, including natural gas, oil, sand, gravel and combustible shale.

Agriculture, construction, industry, and transportation form the core of the economy in Guba.

Agriculture 
Agriculture in Guba is primarily focused on the production of fruits and vegetables. There are numerous orchards within Guba territory. The main agricultural products of Guba are sunflowers, potatoes, grapes, cereal/dried pulses, sugar beets, hazelnuts, pomegranates and olives, but the region is also known for growing wheat and breeding cows.

In Guba, special breeds of sheep are raised and their wool is used for the local fur industry.

The total value of production of the main products was 213,183,000 manat in 2011, 2,596,595,000 manat in 2012, 2,262,579,000 manat in 2013, 2,264,253,000 manat in 2014, and 1,914,185,000 manat in 2015.

The total value of production of agriculture, forest farming and fishing goods increased by 17.4% from 2011 to 2015.

Statistics of agricultural sector in Guba

Construction 
In 2016, there were 6 construction enterprises in Guba. The total value of construction works was 46,620,000 manat.

In Guba, new power generation plants are being constructed to meet increased demand for electricity.

Statistics of construction works in Guba

Industry 
As the agricultural sector in Guba has grown, other industrial sectors have developed. Light industry and food industry are core industries. Electric plants in Guba are a large part of the region's industry.

Food industry 
Food industry includes the production of wine, meat and milk, bakery, canned fruit and vegetable, flour, etc.

Light industry 
Carpet-making and small local sewing enterprises are part of light industry in Guba. In the villages of Guba, carpet-making continues to develop as a traditional handicraft art.

Construction materials industry 
Guba also produces construction materials from local raw materials including sand, stone, and wood.

Statistics regarding industry in Guba

Transportation 
There are some roads that pass through the area of Guba. A 208 kilometer-long road along the Baku-Guba-border with Russia was built at a total cost of 493.3 million USD.

There are highways, telecommunication lines connecting Azerbaijan and Russia, and oil and gas pipelines also pass through the Guba-Khacmaz economic region.

Statistics regarding transportation in Guba

See also 
Economy of Azerbaijan

References

External links 
 The Ministry of Economy of the Republic of Azerbaijan

Guba
Quba District (Azerbaijan)
Economy of Azerbaijan